The following is a list of state highways in Tennessee shorter than one mile (1.6 km) in length. Most of these highways act as service roads, old alignments of more prominent highways, or connectors between one or more highways. Several of these highways have their own articles; those highways are summarized here and a link is provided to the main article. This list does not include highways where at least one highway of that number is at least one mile in length. All highways at least one mile in length have their own article.

State Route 239

State Route 239 (SR 239), also known as Pikeview Street, is an east–west state highway located entirely in Weakley County in West Tennessee. It connects SR 22 with SR 89 and SR 54 in the county seat of Dresden. The entire route of SR 239 is a two-lane highway passing through residential areas. It is also a former alignment of SR 22, prior to the new 4-lane bypass being built to the south.

State Route 301

State Route 301 (SR 301) is a  state highway located entirely in Bledsoe County, Tennessee. The route originates at a junction with SR 285 in Mount Crest within Bledsoe State Forest, and its northern terminus is at a dead end at the Taft Youth Center, a facility of the Tennessee Department of Children's Services. The entire route of SR 301 is a rural two-lane highway.

State Route 316

State Route 316 (SR 316) is a  state highway located entirely in Hamilton County, and the city of Chattanooga, Tennessee. It follows M.L.K. Boulevard between US 27 (I-124/SR 27/SR 29) to SR 2 in downtown Chattanooga.

State Route 356

State Route 356 (SR 356), also known as E Wood Street, is a  state highway in Henry County that serves as a connector between US 641/SR 69 in downtown Paris to US 79 (SR 76) on the town's east side. Excluding its eastern end, the entire route of SR 356 is a two-lane highway. It also follows of a former alignment of US 79 (SR 76).

State Route 389

State Route 389 (SR 389) is a  state highway in the Chattanooga area in Hamilton County. The route follows 4th Street between I-124/US 27 and SR 8 in downtown Chattanooga.

State Route 418

State Route 418 (SR 418) is a connector route in Johnson County that connects US 421 (SR 34) to SR 91 in Mountain City.

SR 418 begins at US 421/SR 34/SR 67 south of downtown Mountain City, and heads north to junction with the former alignment of SR 91 in downtown and then turns west and ends at US 421/SR 34/SR 67.

SR 418 formerly ended at SR 91 in downtown Mountain City, until SR 91 was rerouted to a new alignment north of downtown.

State Route 434
 

It originates at the SR 46 junction with SR 233 in Cumberland City, and ends at SR 149 on the east side of town near the Guices Creek Recreation Area.

State Route 446

State Route 446 (SR 446), also known as Foothills Mall Drive, is a four-lane state highway in Maryville, Blount County, Tennessee. The  route connects US 321 (SR 73) with US 129 (SR 115), while also providing access to Foothills Mall.

State Route 447

State Route 447 (SR 447), also known as S Washington Street, is a supplemental route in the Blount County, Tennessee, seat of Maryville. The  route connects US 321 (SR 73) with US 411 (SR 35) on Maryville's east side. It is a 4-lane undivided highway with a center turn lane for its entire length. SR 447 is the shortest state highway in Tennessee.

State Route 448

State Route 448 (SR 448) is a  state route located entirely in Sevier County in East Tennessee. It serves as a continuation of the Great Smoky Mountains Parkway that bypasses the county seat of Sevierville. It connects the SR 66 north of downtown to US 441 (SR 71) south of downtown, thereby making up the continuous route between I-40 and the Pigeon Forge-Gatlinburg tourist areas. It is more commonly known as North Parkway. There are three northbound lanes, a center turn lane, and one southbound lane. This is in order to accommodate for the traffic heading north out of the busy tourist area, since the majority of the southbound traffic enters via SR 66.

State Route 450

State Route 450 (SR 450) is an unsigned state route located entirely in Knox County in East Tennessee. The  route, known locally as Joe Johnson Drive, connects US 11/70 (Neyland Drive, SR 1/SR 158) with Volunteer Boulevard on the campus of the University of Tennessee on the west side of downtown Knoxville. It serves as a feeder route for traffic between the main campus and the agricultural campus for the university.

SR 450 begins at an intersection with US 11/US 70/SR 1/SR 158 (Neyland Drive). It travels to the northeast, crossing through the agricultural campus of the University of Tennessee at Knoxville and over a CSX Rail line. It meets its Eastern terminus, an intersection with Volunteer Blvd on the West side of the main campus of The University of Tennessee at Knoxville.

See also
List of state routes in Tennessee

References

External links
Tennessee Department of Transportation

Lists of roads in Tennessee
Shorter than one mile
Tennessee